Dean A. Connor is a Canadian businessman currently serving as President and Chief Executive Officer of Sun Life Financial, an international financial services organization. Sun Life is based in Toronto, Ontario, Canada and has operations in 26 markets. It provides insurance, wealth and asset management to individuals and corporate clients.



Early life 

Connor was born in Hamilton, Ontario, Canada. He graduated in 1978 from the Honours Business Administration (HBA) program at the Ivey School of Business at the University of Western Ontario. He is a Fellow of the Society of Actuaries and the Canadian Institute of Actuaries.

Career

Early career 
In 1978, Connor joined Mercer Human Resource Consulting. Over the course of 28 years, he rose to CEO of Mercer's Canadian operations, focusing on the areas of investment, retirement, group benefits and compensation, and then to its President for the Americas, encompassing the U.S., Canada and Latin America.

Sun Life Financial 
Connor joined Sun Life in 2006 as Executive Vice-President with responsibility for the Company's United Kingdom and Reinsurance operations, strategic international activities and corporate functions. He was appointed President of Sun Life's Canadian operations in 2008.

In 2010, Connor became Chief Operating Officer with executive responsibility for Sun Life’s Canadian and United Kingdom operations, MFS Investment Management, Corporate Marketing, Human Resources, Information Technology and other shared business services.

Connor was appointed Sun Life's President and Chief Executive Officer on December 1, 2011, and is also a member of the Company’s Board of Directors.

Philanthropy/Associations 

Connor is on the board of directors of the Business Council of Canada, a Trustee for the University Health Network in Toronto and a member of the Ivey Business School Advisory Board and the Asia Business Leaders Advisory Council. He served on the board of directors of the Canadian Life and Health Insurance Association, and chaired Toronto Rehabilitation Institute’s $100 million "Where Incredible Happens" campaign. Connor has been involved for many years with United Way of Canada and was the Chair of the 2017 United Way Campaign for Toronto and York Region.

Honours and awards 
 In 2014, Connor was named Top New CEO by Canadian Business magazine
 In 2017, Connor was recognized as One of the Top 40 Canadian Executive on Twitter and ranked one of the top 25 CEOs in Canada by Glassdoor
 In 2017, Connor was named Canada’s Outstanding CEO of the Year™
In 2018, Connor was named Ivey Business Leader of the Year
In 2019, Connor was named one of the 100 Best-Performing CEOs in the World by the Harvard Business Review

Personal life 
Connor is married to Maris Uffelmann and has three children.

References 

Businesspeople from Ontario
University of Western Ontario alumni
Year of birth missing (living people)
Living people